This Place Rules is a 2022 American documentary film directed by Andrew Callaghan in his feature directorial debut. It follows Callaghan as he travels across the United States in the months preceding the January 6 attack on the U.S. Capitol. The film premiered on HBO on December 30, 2022, and was released on HBO Max the following day.

Production
Andrew Callaghan is the presenter and co-founder of Channel 5, a digital media company and web channel known for its gonzo journalism and man on the street interviews. He first discussed the then-untitled film on a July 2021 episode of the Fear & Malding podcast hosted by Hasan Piker and Will Neff. In September 2022, HBO acquired the distribution rights for a documentary film directed by Callaghan centering around the January 6 United States Capitol attack. A24, Strong Baby Productions, and Abso Lutely Productions were also announced as production companies. Segments from the film were shown to those who attended the Channel 5 Live tour in late 2022, during which Callaghan also revealed that it would be titled This Place Rules and released on HBO Max on December 30, 2022. The film's first trailer was released on December 8, 2022, confirming the title and premiere date. InfoWars host and conspiracy theorist Alex Jones appears in the film.

Release
This Place Rules premiered on HBO on December 30, 2022, and began streaming on HBO Max the next day.

References

External links
 

2022 documentary films
2022 directorial debut films
2020s American films
A24 (company) films
HBO Max films
Films shot in Washington, D.C.
Films produced by Jonah Hill